The 1983 NASCAR Budweiser Late Model Sportsman Series began on February 19 and ended on October 30. Sam Ard won the championship at season's end.

Schedule
Schedule as follows

Races

Goody's 300 

The Goody's 300 was held February 19 at Daytona International Speedway. Sam Ard won the pole.

Top Ten Results

17-Darrell Waltrip
89-Geoff Bodine
75-Neil Bonnett
28-Phil Parsons
7-Morgan Shepherd
00-Sam Ard
12-Tommy Ellis
82-Joe Ruttman
21-Larry Pearson
6-Tommy Houston

Eastern 150 

The Eastern 150 was held February 26 at Richmond Fairgrounds Raceway.

Top Ten Results

00-Sam Ard
6-Tommy Houston
1-Pete Silva
11-Jack Ingram
50-Geoff Bodine
20-Bosco Lowe
28-Phil Parsons
14-Ronnie Silver
44-Rick Hanley
06-Rodney Howard

Coca-Cola 200 

The Coca-Cola 200 was held March 5 at North Carolina Motor Speedway.

Top Ten Results

15-Dale Earnhardt
88-Bobby Allison
01-Butch Lindley
34-L. D. Ottinger
70-Bosco Lowe
75-Neil Bonnett
6-Tommy Houston
11-Jack Ingram
28-Phil Parsons
1-Pete Silva

Mello Yello 200 

The Mello Yello 200 was held March 13 at Hickory Motor Speedway.

Top Ten Results

12-Tommy Ellis
7-Morgan Shepherd
00-Sam Ard
1-Pete Silva
14-Ronnie Silver
11-Jack Ingram
32-Dale Jarrett
28-Phil Parsons
06-Rodney Howard
10-Gary Neice

Miller Time 250 
The Miller Time 250 was held March 20 at Martinsville Speedway.

Top Ten Results

00-Sam Ard
7-Morgan Shepherd
11-Jack Ingram
4-Joe Thurman
1-Pete Silva
6-Tommy Houston
16-Jimmy Lawson
06-Rodney Howard
12-Tommy Ellis
19-Diane Teel

Holly Farms Fried Chicken 3-99 
The Holly Farms Fried Chicken 3-99 was held April 3 at North Wilkesboro Speedway.

Top Ten Results

00-Sam Ard
6-Tommy Houston
7-Morgan Shepherd
1-Pete Silva
14-Ronnie Silver
11-Jack Ingram
2-Jeff Hensley
4-Joe Thurman
16-Jimmy Lawson
04-Eddie Falk

WDVA 200 
The WDVA 200 was held April 16 at South Boston Speedway.

Top Ten Results

12-Tommy Ellis
20-Bosco Lowe
10-Gary Neice
2-Jeff Hensley
04-Eddie Falk
63-Jimmy Hensley
7-Morgan Shepherd
39-Mitchell Clark
32-Dale Jarrett
01-Butch Lindley

Coca-Cola 200 
The Coca-Cola 200 was held April 30 at Greenville-Pickens Speedway.

Top Ten Results

11-Jack Ingram
01-Butch Lindley
32-Dale Jarrett
6-Tommy Houston
03-Tony Warren
7-Morgan Shepherd
27-Mike Messer
2-Jeff Hensley
00-Sam Ard
04-Eddie Falk

Hampton Chevrolet 250 
The Hampton Chevrolet 250 was held May 7 at Langley Speedway.

Top Ten Results

11-Jack Ingram
1-Pete Silva
32-Dale Jarrett
6-Tommy Houston
9-Bob Shreeves
07-Dickie Boswell
00-Sam Ard
16-Jimmy Lawson
20-Bosco Lowe
22-Rick Mast

Late Model Sportsman 200 
The Sportsman 200 was held May 14 at Dover Downs International Speedway.

Top Ten Results

01-Ricky Rudd
22-Bobby Allison
00-Sam Ard
15-Dale Earnhardt
24-Glenn Jarrett
1-Pete Silva
70-Bosco Lowe
12-Tommy Ellis
34-Joe Kelly
08-Ken Bouchard

Southeastern 150 
The Southeastern 150 was held May 21 at Bristol Motor Speedway.

Top Ten Results

7-Morgan Shepherd
32-Dale Jarrett
12-Tommy Ellis
22-Rick Mast
6-Tommy Houston
20-Bosco Lowe
18-Jeff Berry
63-Jimmy Hensley
00-Sam Ard
72-Tommy Hilbert

Charlotte Mello Yello 300 
The Charlotte Mello Yello 300 was held May 28 at Charlotte Motor Speedway.

Top Ten Results

15-Dale Earnhardt
75-Neil Bonnett
17-Bill Elliott
28-Harry Gant
22-Bobby Allison
11-Jack Ingram
98-Joe Ruttman
6-Tommy Houston
23-Davey Allison
34-Joe Kelly

Earnhardt's win is now recognised as the first-ever NASCAR win for Hendrick Motorsports, as it was the first NASCAR national series for All Star Racing, a partnership between Rick Hendrick and Robert Gee.  That team moved to the Cup Series in 1984, and in 1985 became Hendrick Motorsports.

Busch 200 
The Busch 200 was held June 4 at South Boston Speedway.

Top Ten Results

12-Tommy Ellis
36-Butch Lindley
11-Jack Ingram
22-Rick Mast
32-Dale Jarrett
1-Pete Silva
51-Robert Ingram
41-Jack Bland
16-Jimmy Lawson
20-Bosco Lowe

Shoney's 200 
The Shoney's 200 was held June 11 at Hickory Motor Speedway.

Top Ten Results

Tommy Ellis
Jack Ingram
Sam Ard
Bob Shreeves
Butch Lindley
Tony Warren
Bennie Davis
Jimmy Hensley
Dale Jarrett
Ronnie Silver

L. D. Swain & Son 200 
The L. D. Swain & Son 200 was held June 18 at Orange County Speedway.

Top Ten Results

Jack Ingram
Tommy Ellis
Butch Lindley
Sam Ard
Tommy Houston
Bob Shreeves
Ronnie Silver
Phil Parsons
Jimmy Hensley
Charlie Luck

Rose's Stores 200 
The Rose's Stores 200 was held June 25 at South Boston Speedway.

Top Ten Results

Tommy Ellis
Jack Ingram
Butch Lindley
Morgan Shepherd
Bob Shreeves
Eddie Falk
Phil Parsons
Charlie Luck
Ronnie Silver
Dickie Boswell

Mason Day Paving 200 
The Mason Day Paving 200 was held July 2 at Orange County Speedway.

Top Ten Results

Tommy Houston
Jack Ingram
Dale Jarrett
Sam Ard
Ronnie Silver
Jimmy Hensley
Robert Ingram
Junior Miller
Bob Shreeves
Jeff Hensley

Goody's Invitational 200 
The Goody's Invitational 200 was held July 6 at Caraway Speedway.

Top Ten Results

Butch Lindley
Jack Ingram
Jimmy Hensley
Tommy Houston
Dale Jarrett
Eddie Falk
Sam Ard
Ronnie Silver
Bob Shreeves
Jeff Hensley

Mello Yello 200 
The Mello Yello 200 was held July 9 at Orange County Speedway.

Top Ten Results

Tommy Houston
Jack Ingram
Sam Ard
Phil Parsons
Dale Jarrett
Tommy Ellis
Jimmy Hensley
Ronnie Silver
Eddie Falk
Butch Lindley

Coca-Cola 200 
The Coca-Cola 200 was held July 23 at South Boston Speedway.

Top Ten Results

Tommy Ellis
Jack Ingram
Dale Jarrett
Sam Ard
Robert Ingram
Tommy Houston
Rick Mast
Bob Shreeves
Bosco Lowe
Larry Pearson

Goody's 200 
The Goody's 200 was held July 30 at Hickory Motor Speedway.

Top Ten Results

Sam Ard
Jack Ingram
Tommy Ellis
Bob Shreeves
Dale Jarrett
Ronnie Silver
Eddie Falk
Larry Pearson
Jimmy Hensley
Joe Thurman

Virginia 200 
The Virginia 200 was held August 6 at Langley Speedway.

Top Ten Results

Jack Ingram
Dale Jarrett
Tommy Ellis
Butch Lindley
Jimmy Lawson
Eddie Falk
Sam Ard
Jimmy Hensley
Bob Shreeves
Charlie Luck

Kroger NASCAR 200 
The Kroger NASCAR 200 was held August 13 at Indianapolis Raceway Park.

Top Ten Results

Tommy Houston
Darrell Waltrip
Sam Ard
Phil Parsons
Tommy Ellis
Dale Jarrett
Rodney Howard
Morgan Shepherd
Jimmy Hensley
Ronnie Silver

Dapco Auto Parts 200 
The Dapco Auto Parts 200 was held August 20 at Greenville-Pickens Speedway.

Top Ten Results

Butch Lindley
Dale Jarrett
Jack Ingram
Jimmy Hensley
Ronnie Silver
Sam Ard
Charlie Luck
Larry Pearson
Jeff Hensley
Bennie Davis

Free Service Tire Stores 150 
The Free Service Tire Stores 150 was held August 26 at Bristol Motor Speedway.

Top Ten Results

Sam Ard
Jack Ingram
Tommy Ellis
Morgan Shepherd
Rick Mast
Tommy Houston
Charlie Luck
Jimmy Lawson
Tommy Hilbert
Jeff Hall

Bobby Isaac Memorial 200 
The Bobby Isaac Memorial 200 was held September 3 at Hickory Motor Speedway.

Top Ten Results

Tommy Houston
Jack Ingram
Dale Jarrett
Tommy Ellis
Sam Ard
Pete Silva
Jimmy Lawson
Bob Shreeves
Ronnie Silver
Eddie Falk

Darlington 250 
The Darlington 250 was held September 4 at Darlington Raceway.

Top Ten Results

Neil Bonnett
Sam Ard
Jack Ingram
Davey Allison
Ron Bouchard
Glenn Jarrett
Tommy Ellis
Tommy Houston
Bosco Lowe
Pete Silva

NOTE:  This race was run on Sunday;  under South Carolina Blue Laws, the distance was 250 miles to comply with the ban on Sunday racing unless the race distance was 250 miles or greater.

Miller Time 150 
The Miller Time 150 was held September 10 at Richmond Fairgrounds Raceway.

Top Ten Results

Morgan Shepherd
Tommy Ellis
Dale Jarrett
Tommy Houston
Sam Ard
Jimmy Hensley
Jack Ingram
Bosco Lowe
Dickie Boswell
Jack Bland

Coca-Cola 400 
The Coca-Cola 400 was held September 11 at North Wilkesboro Speedway.

Top Ten Results

Tommy Ellis
Tommy Houston
Jimmy Hensley
Larry Pearson
Sam Ard
Jack Ingram
Phil Parsons
Ronnie Silver
Bob Shreeves
Rodney Howard

Miller High Life Invitational 300 
The Miller High Life Invitational 300 was held September 17 at South Boston Speedway.

Top Ten Results

Sam Ard
Jack Ingram
Ronnie Silver
Tommy Ellis
Dickie Boswell
Phil Parsons
Al Hylton
Tommy Houston
Eddie Falk
Jeff Hensley

Autumn 150 
The Autumn 150 was held September 24 at Martinsville Speedway.

Top Ten Results

Sam Ard
Morgan Shepherd
Dale Jarrett
Phil Parsons
Jack Ingram
Jimmy Hensley
Charlie Luck
Pete Silva
Eddie Falk
Rick Mast

Soloman Enterprises 200 
The Soloman Enterprises 200 was held October 1 at Orange County Speedway.

Top Ten Results

Sam Ard
Dale Jarrett
Tommy Houston
Jack Ingram
Jimmy Hensley
Rick Mast
Dickie Boswell
Jack Bland
Jeff Hensley
Eddie Falk

Miller Time 300 
The Miller Time 300 was held October 8 at Charlotte Motor Speedway.

Top Ten Results

Sam Ard
Dale Earnhardt
Ron Bouchard
Bobby Allison
Neil Bonnett
Lake Speed
Davey Allison
Glenn Jarrett
Pete Silva
Rodney Combs

Benny Yount Chrysler-Plymouth 200 
The Benny Yount Chrysler-Plymouth 200 was held October 16 at Hickory Motor Speedway.

Top Ten Results

Jack Ingram
Sam Ard
Dale Jarrett
Ronnie Silver
Charlie Luck
Bob Shreeves
Allan Powell
Morgan Shepherd
Eddie Falk
Ronnie Davidson

Cardinal 250 
The Cardinal 250 was held October 30 at Martinsville Speedway.

Top Ten Results

Sam Ard
Dale Jarrett
Jack Ingram
Pete Silva
Jimmy Hensley
Jay Hedgecock
Phil Parsons
Jeff Hensley
Bob Shreeves
Larry Ogle

Final Points Standings 

Sam Ard - 5454
Jack Ingram - 5367
Tommy Houston - 4933
Tommy Ellis -  4929
Dale Jarrett - 4837
Ronnie Silver - 4058
Pete Silva - 3945
Jimmy Hensley - 3716
Eddie Falk - 3617
Jeff Hensley - 3444

See also
1983 NASCAR Winston Cup Series

References

External links 
NASCAR Budweiser Late Model Sportsman Series Standings and Statistics for 1983

NASCAR Xfinity Series seasons